Titanium(II) bromide is the inorganic compound with the formula TiBr2.  It is a black micaceous solid.  It adopts the cadmium iodide structure, featuring octahedral Ti(II) centers.  It arises via the reaction of the elements:
Ti + Br2  →  TiBr2

The compound reacts with caesium bromide to give the linear chain compound CsTiBr3.

References

Titanium(II) compounds
Bromides
Titanium halides